Njeru is a town in Buikwe District, in the Central Region of Uganda. It is the largest town in the district. It is mainly a residential town. However, it hosts  industries such as East African Packaging Solutions Limited, a manufacturer of paper packaging supplies, Nile Breweries Limited, a subsidiary of AB InBev and Nyanza Textile Industries Limited (Nytil), a textile manufacturer.

Location
The town is located across the River Nile from the city of Jinja and is functionally a suburb of that city. The coordinate of Njeru Town Council are:0°25'52.0"N, 33°08'52.0"E (Latitude:0.431111; Longitude:33.147778).

Economic activity
There are several industries and businesses located in Njeru that provide employment to a significant number of people and contribute significantly to the economy of Uganda. These include but are not limited to:

1. Nile Breweries Limited, a subsidiary of SAB Miller, based in South Africa and ultimately of AB InBev of Belgium

2. Nalubaale Power Station - Installed Capacity 180 MW, owned by the Ugandan government. Operated under concession by Eskom (Uganda), a subsidiary of Eskom

3. East African Packaging Solutions - A 50/50 Joint Venture between the Madhvani Group and Graphic Systems Limited.

4. Nile Vocational Institute - A Technical College with over 100 Students founded by German Charity Kindernothilfe

5. Vitafoam Industries - A Factory Manufacturing Mattresses.

6. Njeru Stock Farm - Formerly a government Livestock Farm, now Used as an Army Detach.

7. Nytil Picfare - The biggest garments factory in Uganda, making garments out of locally grown organic cotton.

Transportation
Both the old Kampala-Jinja Highway and the new Kampala–Jinja Expressway, pass through Njeru and are part of the northern corridor of the Trans-Africa Highway. The Kampala–Jinja Expressway connects to the Source of the Nile Bridge in Njeru.

Population
In 2014, the national population census put the population of Njeru at 159,549. In 2020, UBOS estimated the population of Njeru at 178,800 people. The population agency calculated the average annual growth rate of the town's population at 1.97 percent every year, between 2014 and 2020.

See also
 Isimba Power Station
 Bujagali Power Station
 Kiira Power Station
 List of cities and towns in Uganda

References

External links
 Njeru receives Donation from Canadian NGO

Populated places in Central Region, Uganda
Cities in the Great Rift Valley
Populated places on Lake Victoria
Populated places on the Nile
Buikwe District